Pleasant Goat and Big Big Wolf – Amazing Pleasant Goat is a 2015 Chinese animated family fantasy adventure comedy film directed by Huang Weiming. It was released on January 31, 2015. Part of the film series based on the animated television series Pleasant Goat and Big Big Wolf. It is preceded by Meet the Pegasus (2014) and is followed by Pleasant Goat and Big Big Wolf - Dunk for Future (2022).

Plot 
Weslie and Paddi are good friends who are both dreaming to become "Dragon Slayer". However, in one day, they have arguments and Paddi goes to the wolf fortress in a fit of pique. Weslie goes there to rescue Paddi but they all end up traveling back to the ancient time in a turmoil. Paddi and Wolffy swap their bodies accidentally in the turmoil. But what's worse is that they meet a ferocious dragon that's able to turn creatures into rocks! Weslie and his friends bravely guard the ancient world and become dragon slayers. Paddi became the "Dragon Slayer" at the end, and Weslie and Paddi became friends again.

Voice cast
Zu Qing
Zhang Lin
YYY
Gao Quansheng
Liang Ying
Deng Yuting
Liu Hongyun
Zhao Na

Release
The film was released on December 31, 2015, as part of the Chinese New Year slate, along Detective Chinatown.

Reception

Box office
The film earned $162,600 CNY from previews. On its opening day, the film earned $14.83 million CNY, dropping dramatically on its third day from $11.24 million to $3.82 million CNY. The film had a three-day total of $28.9 million CNY and a five-day total of $37.14 million CNY. By February 5, the film had earned  at the Chinese box office. The film ended with a total gross of $67.81 million CNY, the lowest ever gross for a film of the franchise.

References

External links

2015 animated films
2015 films
2010s adventure comedy films
2010s fantasy comedy films
Animated adventure films
Animated comedy films
Chinese animated fantasy films
Pleasant Goat and Big Big Wolf films
2015 comedy films